Machino may refer to:
Henmaru Machino (born 1969), Japanese artist
Kazuyoshi Machino, Japanese photographer, winner of the Higashikawa Prize in the Domestic Photographer nomination
, Japanese footballer
Machino (rural locality), several rural localities in Russia

Japanese-language surnames